The 1996 Metro Atlantic Athletic Conference baseball tournament took place from May 10 through 12, 1996. The top two regular season finishers of the league's two divisions met in the double-elimination tournament held at Heritage Park in Colonie, New York.  won their second consecutive (and second overall) tournament championship and advanced to the play-in round for the right to play in the 1996 NCAA Division I baseball tournament.

Seeding 
The top two teams from each division were seeded based on their conference winning percentage. They then played a double-elimination tournament.

Results

References 

Tournament
Metro Atlantic Athletic Conference Baseball Tournament
Metro Atlantic Athletic Conference baseball tournament